Lucy Montgomery (born 24 January 1975) is a British actress, comedian and writer.

Career
While at Jesus College, Cambridge, Montgomery was a member of the Footlights, its amateur theatrical club.  Subsequently, she studied at the Central School of Speech and Drama. Montgomery built her career as one third of Comedy Theatre Company Population 3, along with James Bachman and Barunka O'Shaughnessy, and she appeared as a roving reporter for the comic television programme The Friday Night Project. Other television work has included Bo' Selecta!, The Mighty Boosh, and The IT Crowd.

Montgomery has been heard in several Radio 4 programmes, including the radio phone-in spoof Down the Line, Robin and Wendy's Wet Weekends, The Way We Live Right Now, The Museum of Everything, The Department, Another Case of Milton Jones, The Party Line, Harry Hill's Ghost of a Christmas Present, The Pits, the Torchwood story "Lost Souls" and Lucy Montgomery's Variety Pack. She produced a pilot for her own sketch show pilot for the BBC called The Full Montgomery which went on to run on Radio 4 for two series.

In 2005, Montgomery began writing for and performing in the comedy sketch show Tittybangbang on BBC Three. The sketch comedy series also stars Debbie Chazen and has had three series, from 2005 to late 2007. She was in The Armstrong and Miller Show on BBC One, and Bellamy's People on BBC Two. She has also been on The Law of the Playground and The Wall on BBC Three. She provided the voice of Destiny in Mongrels. Montgomery had various roles in The Life of Rock with Brian Pern and Harry and Paul's Story of the Twos. She was also the voice of Jeanine and other female characters in the Animated Puppetoon children's television series A Town Called Panic.

She voiced for the series Badly Dubbed Porn on Comedy Central.

She has starred in many stage productions, including leads in record-breaking and critically acclaimed Jerusalem with Mark Rylance at the Royal Court in 2009, the 2011–12 revival of Stephen Sondheim's Company at the Sheffield Crucible and Canvas at the Chichester Festival in 2012.

Montgomery appeared in the musical Viva Forever!, based on the music of the Spice Girls.

Personal life
Montgomery is married to fellow comedian Rhys Thomas. They and their two daughters, Polly (born 2008) and Rosie Rae (born 2010), live in East London.

Filmography

Film

Television

Video games

References

External links

BBC biog

1975 births
Living people
20th-century English actresses
21st-century English actresses
Actresses from Surrey
Alumni of Jesus College, Cambridge
Alumni of the Royal Central School of Speech and Drama
English radio actresses
English television actresses
English voice actresses
English women comedians
People from Epsom